Alucita sertifera is a species of moth of the family Alucitidae. It is known from the Republic of Congo.

References

Endemic fauna of the Republic of the Congo
Alucitidae
Fauna of the Republic of the Congo
Moths described in 1921
Moths of Africa
Taxa named by Edward Meyrick